Middle East College (MEC) is a college based in Muscat, Oman. It is one of the leading higher education institution in the Sultanate of Oman, with over 5,100 students. MEC is affiliated to Coventry University, UK. It is located in the Knowledge Oasis Muscat.

Middle East College has undergraduate and postgraduate programmes in the disciplines of engineering, business, and technology. MEC has partnerships with Microsoft IT Academy (ITA), Oracle Academy Initiative Program, Cisco Networking Academy Program, EC-Council Scholarship, SAP, Linux Professional Institute and Information Technology Authority, Oman.

History
The Middle East College was founded in 2002 by Dr. Abdullah Saif Ahmed Al Sabahy, and Mr. Lefeer Muhamed, in association with Sultan's Special Forces Pension Fund (SSFPF).

Academic aspects
MEC is primarily a teaching college and not research led.

MEC has the following academic programmes:

  Mechanical Engineering
  Civil Engineering
  Electronics and Instrumentation
  Electronics and Telecommunication
  Computer Engineering with pathway in Information Security
  Computer Engineering with pathway in Networking
  Quantity Surveying and Construction Management
  Computer Science with pathway in Data Analytics
  Computer Science with pathway in Software Technology
  Computer Science with pathway in Computer Science
  Logistics Management
  Business Administration with pathway in General Management
  Business Administration with pathway in Marketing
  Business Administration with pathway in Human Resources
  Business Administration with pathway in Accounting and Finance
  Archives & Records Management
  Master of Business Administration (MBA)
  MSc in Information Technology
  MSc in Construction Project  and Cost Management
  MSc in Electronic Engineering
  MSc in Records and Information Management

Student activities
Student clubs include a Computing Club, Electronics Club, Design Club, Photography Club, Math Club, Net Club, Business Society, Dramatics society, and the English Speaking society.

International links
Students from 24 countries are undertaking their studies in Middle East College.

MEC has established links with academic institutions around the world to enable its students to participate in cultural exchange programs in:

 India
 Italy
 South Korea
 Spain
 United Kingdom

MEC partners with the following institutions:

  University of Coventry (UK)
  Breda University of Applied Sciences (UK)
  University of Wolverhampton (UK)

References

2002 establishments in Oman
Educational institutions established in 2002
Colleges in Oman
Universities and colleges in Muscat, Oman